The 1984 Sun Belt Conference men's basketball tournament was held March 2–4 at the Birmingham–Jefferson Civic Center in Birmingham, Alabama.

Hosts UAB upset  in the championship game, 62–60, to win their third overall, as well as third consecutive, Sun Belt men's basketball tournament.

The Blazers, in turn, received an automatic bid for the 1984 NCAA tournament. They were joined in the tournament by fellow Sun Belt member VCU, who received an at-large bid.

Format
There were no changes made to the tournament format from the previous year. All eight conference members were placed into the initial quarterfinal round, with each team being seeded based on its regular season conference record.

Bracket

See also
Sun Belt Conference women's basketball tournament

References

Sun Belt Conference men's basketball tournament
Tournament
Sun Belt Conference men's basketball tournament
Sun Belt Conference men's basketball tournament